Sir Walter Clegg (18 April 1920 – 15 April 1994) was a British Conservative politician.

Clegg contested Ince in 1959 and was elected Member of Parliament for North Fylde in 1966. He became a Lord of the Treasury in 1970 and was successively Vice-Chamberlain of the Household in 1972 and Comptroller of the Household from 1973 to 1974. He was MP for Wyre from 1983 until his retirement in 1987.

Personal life
Clegg was born on 18 April 1920 in Bury, Lancashire, the son of a weaver.

He was educated at Bury Grammar School, Blackpool's Arnold School and University of Manchester Law School. He became a solicitor in 1947, having qualified by a correspondence course conducted from a German prisoner-of-war camp during World War II while serving in the Royal Artillery. He later became a partner in the firm of Ingham, Clegg and Crowther, on North Albert Street in Fleetwood, Lancashire.

In 1951, Clegg began 42 years of marriage to Elise Hargreaves, who was working as a reporter at Blackpool's Evening Gazette. She was assigned to cover the proceedings at the local Magistrate's Court, where her future husband was defending a client.

In 1955 he was elected as a Lancashire County Councillor, serving until 1961.

Clegg was knighted in 1980.

In 1984, the Irish Republican Army bombed Brighton's Grand Hotel. Along with several other people, Clegg, whose bedroom was directly above the explosion, was badly hurt, and spent the majority of his later life in a wheelchair.

Until his wife's death in 1993, they lived together at Beech House on Raikes Road in Thornton, Lancashire.

Death
Clegg died on 15 April 1994 in Fleetwood, aged 73.

References

External links
Clegg's obituary

Conservative Party (UK) MPs for English constituencies
1920 births
1994 deaths
People educated at Arnold School
People educated at Bury Grammar School
Alumni of the University of Manchester
English solicitors
Royal Artillery personnel
UK MPs 1966–1970
UK MPs 1970–1974
UK MPs 1974
UK MPs 1974–1979
UK MPs 1979–1983
UK MPs 1983–1987
Councillors in Lancashire
People from Thornton-Cleveleys
People from Bury, Greater Manchester
Knights Bachelor
20th-century English lawyers
British Army personnel of World War II
British World War II prisoners of war
World War II prisoners of war held by Germany
Military personnel from Lancashire